"All I Want" is a song recorded by the German musician known under the pseudonym of Captain Hollywood Project, released in May 1993 as the third single from his debut album, Love Is Not Sex (1993). It was co-written by Nosie Katzmann and was a hit in several countries, but achieved a minor success in comparison with the project's two previous singles, "More and More" and "Only with You". The single peaked at number two in Portugal and on the Canadian RPM Dance/Urban chart. On the Eurochart Hot 100, it reached number 22.

Critical reception
Larry Flick from Billboard wrote that the act "that scored big with "More & More" offers an equally sparkling gem from its noteworthy "Love Is Not Sex" set. Track travels down a slower, more R&B-flavored path, matching deep-voiced male rapping with sultry female belting at the chorus." Wendi Cermak from The Network Forty said that "here's yet another pop-influenced trance/ambient (...) number from Captain Hollywood. The vocals are very catchy and fit nicely over the hypnotic synth lines." Charles Aaron from Spin complimented the Eddie "Flashin'" Fowlke's "Club Dub" as "state-of-the-art progressive house—almost subliminal organ, stringent percussion whacks, melody via synth hunt-and-peck, lyrics stripped to a simple mantra. Room to breathe or sweat it out. The female vocals are either determined or resigned---I can't decide—which gives the groove its cryptic allure."

Chart performance
"All I Want" went on to become a hit in several European countries, although it didn't reach the same level of success as the project's two first singles. It peaked at number two in Portugal in July 1993, as one of its best chart position. Additionally, the single made it to the top 30 in Austria, Germany, the Netherlands and Sweden, and the top 40 in Belgium and France. It didn't chart on the UK Singles Chart, but peaked at number 51 on the Music Week dance singles chart. On the Eurochart Hot 100, "All I Want" peaked at number 22, while reaching number 11 on the European Dance Radio Chart. Outside Europe, it reached number two on the RPM Dance/Urban chart in Canada.

Music video
A music video was produced to promote the single. It was later published on YouTube in March 2017. The video has amassed more than 194,000 views as of September 2021.

Track listings
 CD maxi 1 (May 1993)
 "All I Want" (Single Video Mix) (3:43)
 "All I Want" (Positive Vibe Mix) (6:13)
 "All I Want" (Sunday Mornin' Mix) (7:41)
 "All I Want" (Naked Eye Mix) (4:42)
			
 CD maxi 2 (June 1993)
 "All I Want" (What The Underground Wants Mix) (7:45)
 "All I Want" (Norway Remix) (7:37)
 "All I Want" (JJ Dance Mix) (7:14)

Charts

Weekly charts

Year-end charts

References

1993 singles
1993 songs
Captain Hollywood Project songs
English-language German songs
Songs written by Nosie Katzmann
Songs written by Tony Dawson-Harrison